Hořice (also known as Hořice v Podkrkonoší) is a town in Jičín District in the Hradec Králové Region of the Czech Republic. It has about 8,300 inhabitants.

Administrative parts
Villages of Březovice, Chlum, Chvalina, Doubrava, Libonice and Svatogothardská Lhota are administrative parts of Hořice.

Geography
It lies on the border between the hilly landscape of the Jičín Uplands in the north, and the flat landscape of the Central Elbe Table in the south.

History

The first written mention of Hořice is from 1143 in the foundation deed of the Strahov Monastery. It was founded on a hill later named Gothard, which was named after the Church of Saint Gotthard founded here in the 12th century. In the 13th century, the settlement was moved to strategically more advantageous place below the hill. In 1365, it was first documented as a market town.

In 1423, Gothard hill was the site of a battle of the Hussite Wars. During the rule of the Smiřický noble family from the mid-16th century to the early 17th century, the town developed rapidly.

In 1846, the town square was damaged by a large fire, which destroyed most of the wooden houses. The wooden buildings were replaced by stone houses, which initiated stone quarrying in many local quarries. This has led to economic development and Hořice turned into a real town. Several factories were established, especially by Jewish entrepreneurs, and sandstone quarrying also developed. In 1882, the railway was built and connected the town with Hradec Králové and Jičín.

Demographics

Economy

The town is known for its production of Hořické trubičky ("Hořice Rolls"), which is a traditional confectionery. The production started here in 1812. The manufactory is a protected geographical indication by the European Union.

Sights

The Baroque deanery Church of the Nativity of the Virgin Mary is one of the most valuable buildings. It was built by plans of Kilian Ignaz Dientzenhofer in 1738–1748. The Hořice Castle was created in the Baroque style in the mid-18th century by reconstruction of a Gothic fortress from 14th–15th century.

On the Gothard hill, there is the cemetery Church of Saint Gotthard. The original Romanesque church was rebuilt in the Baroque style in 1783. On the hill there are also remains of an old fortress with the first-ever Czech sculpture of Jan Žižka, former Jewish cemetery, and a sculpture park.

Notable people
Iacob Felix (1832–1905), Jewish doctor
Fritz Mauthner (1849–1923), Jewish writer and philosopher
Bohumir Kryl (1875–1961), Czech-American cornetist, bandleader and art collector
Karel Vik (1883–1964), painter
Irene Kirpal (1886–1977), politician
Josef Matoušek (1906–1939), historian
Stanislav Fišer (1931–2022), actor and voice actor
Jaroslava Jehličková (born 1942), athlete

Twin towns – sister cities

Hořice is twinned with:
 Jabłonka, Poland
 Kerepes, Hungary
 Strzegom, Poland
 Trstená, Slovakia

References

External links

Virtual show

Cities and towns in the Czech Republic
Populated places in Jičín District
Shtetls